The Unexpected Voyager (French: La voyageuse inattendue) is a 1950 French crime film directed by Jean Stelli and starring Georges Marchal, Dany Robin and Lucienne Le Marchand. It is a remake of the 1934 film Mauvaise Graine. The film's sets were designed by the art director Jacques Colombier.

Synopsis
Marc a photographer tries to reform Dany a car thief and get her a job as a model but she is drawn back into a life of crime by her former gang members.

Cast
 Georges Marchal as Marc Lanson
 Dany Robin as 	Dany
 Lucienne Le Marchand as 	Hélène
 Jean Tissier as Jacques
 Albert Dinan as 	Dudule
 Robert Berri as 	Paolo
 René Hell as 	Adrien
 Ginette Baudin as 	Pamela
 Maurice Ledoux as 	Le troisième gangster
 Nicolas Amato as 	Le maître d'hôtel
 Raoul Marco as 	Dupont
 Maxime Fabert as 	Edouard
 Jacques Beauvais as 	Le garçon

References

Bibliography
 McBride, Joseph.  Billy Wilder: Dancing on the Edge. Columbia University Press, 2021.
 Oscherwitz, Dayna & Higgins, MaryEllen. The A to Z of French Cinema. Scarecrow Press, 2009.

External links 
 

1950 films
1950 crime films
French crime films
1950s French-language films
Films directed by Jean Stelli
Remakes of French films
1950s French films